Cheshmeh Darreh-ye Amirabad (also Romanized as Cheshmeh Darreh-ye Amīrābād; also known as Cheshmeh Darreh) is a village in Margown Rural District, Margown District, Boyer-Ahmad County, Kohgiluyeh and Boyer-Ahmad Province, Iran. At the 2006 census, its population was 155, in 26 families.

References 

Populated places in Boyer-Ahmad County